The tenth edition of the Men's Football Tournament at the Pan American Games was held at the William Kuntz Soccer Center in Indianapolis, United States from August 9 to August 21, 1987. Twelve teams competed, with title defender Uruguay missing. After the preliminary round there was a knock-out stage.

Preliminary round

Group A

Group B

Group C

Final round

Bracket

Semi finals

Bronze medal match

Gold Medal match

Medalists

Goalscorers

References

Pan American Games
1987
Pan Am 1987
Soccer in Indiana
Pan
Pan
Pan
Events at the 1987 Pan American Games